The following is an alphabetical list of articles related to the U.S. state of Washington.

0–9
.wa.us – Internet second-level domain for the state of Washington
42nd state to join the United States of America

A
Adjacent states and province:

Agriculture in Washington
:Category:Agriculture in Washington (state)
AIDS Housing Association of Tacoma
Airports in Washington
Amusement parks in Washington
Anglo-American Convention of 1818
Aquaria in Washington
Arboreta in Washington
American Redoubt
Archaeology in Washington
Archaeological sites in Washington
Architecture in Washington
:Category:Architecture in Washington (state)
Art museums and galleries in Washington
Astronomical observatories in Washington

B
Beaches of Washington
Botanical gardens in Washington
Buildings and structures in Washington

C

Cannabis in Washington
Canyons and gorges of Washington
Capital punishment in Washington
Capital of the State of Washington
Capitol of the State of Washington
Caves of Washington
Census statistical areas of Washington
Cities in Washington
Climate of Washington
Colleges and universities in Washington
Columbia River
Communications in Washington
Companies in Washington
Constitution of the State of Washington
Convention centers in Washington
Counties of the State of Washington
Culture of Washington

D
Demographics of Washington
 Democratic Party of Washington State

E
Economy of Washington
:Category:Economy of Washington (state)
Education in Washington
:Category:Education in Washington (state)
Elections in Washington (state)
:Category:Washington (state) elections
Environment of Washington
Ecology of the North Cascades

F

Festivals in Washington
Fjords of Washington
Flag of the State of Washington
Forts in Washington
Fort Vancouver
:Category:Forts in Washington (state)
Foundation for Early Learning

G

Geography of Washington
:Category:Geography of Washington (state)
Geology of Washington
:Category:Geology of Washington (state)
Ghost towns in Washington
:Category:Ghost towns in Washington (state)
Glaciers of Washington
Golf clubs and courses in Washington
Government of the State of Washington  website
:Category:Government of Washington (state)
Governor of the State of Washington
List of governors of Washington
Great Seal of the State of Washington
Guaranteed Education Tuition Program

H
Healthiest State in the Nation Campaign
Heritage railroads in Washington
High schools of Washington
Higher education in Washington
Highway system of Washington
Highway routes in Washington
History of Washington's state highway system
Hiking trails in Washington
History of Washington (state)
Historical outline of Washington
:Category:History of Washington (state)
Hospitals in Washington
Hot springs of Washington
House of Representatives of the State of Washington

I
Images of Washington
Commons:Category:Washington (state)
Interstate highway routes in Washington
Islands of Washington

J

K

L
Lakes of Washington
Lake Washington
:Category:Lakes of Washington (state)
Landmarks in Washington
 Lewis and Clark Expedition, 1804-1806
 Libertarian Party of Washington
Lieutenant Governor of the State of Washington
Lists related to the State of Washington:
List of airports in Washington
List of Carnegie libraries in Washington (state)
List of census statistical areas in Washington
List of cities in Washington
List of colleges and universities in Washington
List of counties in Washington
List of dams and reservoirs in Washington
List of forts in Washington
List of ghost towns in Washington
List of governors of Washington
List of high schools in Washington (state)
List of highway routes in Washington
List of hospitals in Washington (state)
List of Interstate highway routes in Washington
List of islands of Washington
List of lakes of Washington (state)
List of law enforcement agencies in Washington (state)
List of lieutenant governors of Washington
List of museums in Washington (state)
List of National Historic Landmarks in Washington
List of newspapers in Washington
List of people from Washington (state)
List of power stations in Washington (state)
List of radio stations in Washington (state)
List of Washington (state) railroads
List of Registered Historic Places in Washington
List of rivers of Washington (state)
List of school districts in Washington
List of species native to Washington
List of state forests in Washington
List of state parks in Washington
List of state prisons in Washington
List of symbols of the State of Washington
List of television stations in Washington (state)
List of towns in Washington
List of unincorporated communities in Washington
List of United States congressional delegations from Washington
List of United States congressional districts in Washington
List of United States representatives from Washington
List of United States senators from Washington

M
Maps of Washington
Mass media in Washington
Monuments and memorials in Washington
Mountains of Washington
Mount Rainier
Museums in Washington
:Category:Museums in Washington (state)
Music of Washington
:Category:Music of Washington (state)
:Category:Musical groups from Washington (state)
:Category:Musicians from Washington (state)

N
National Forests of Washington
Natural gas pipelines in Washington
Natural history of Washington
Nature centers in Washington
Newspapers of Washington

O
Olympia, Washington, territorial and state capital since 1853
Oregon Country, 1818–1846
Oregon Treaty of 1846
Outdoor sculptures in Washington
Outline of Washington infrastructure

P
Pacific Northwest Waterways Association
People from Washington
:Category:People from Washington (state)
:Category:People by city in Washington (state)
:Category:People by county in Washington (state)
:Category:People from Washington (state) by occupation
Politics of Washington
 Libertarian Party of Washington
 Socialist Party of Washington
 Washington State Democratic Party
 Washington State Republican Party
:Category:Populated places in Washington (state)
Cities in Washington
Towns in Washington
Census Designated Places in Washington
Other unincorporated communities in Washington
List of ghost towns in Washington
Protected areas of Washington
Provisional Government of Oregon, 1843–1848

Q

R
Radio stations in Washington
Railroad museums in Washington
Railroads in Washington
Registered historic places in Washington
Religion in Washington
:Category:Religion in Washington (state)
 Republican Party of Washington State
Rivers of Washington

S
Scenic and Recreational Highways
School districts of Washington
Scouting in Washington
Seattle
Senate of the State of Washington
Ski areas and resorts in Washington
Snake River
Socialist Party of Washington
Solar power in Washington (state)
Spokane, Washington
Sports in Washington
Sports venues in Washington
State Capitol of Washington
State of Washington  (website)
Constitution of the State of Washington
Government of the State of Washington
:Category:Government of Washington (state)
Governor of the State of Washington
Legislature of the State of Washington
Senate of the State of Washington
House of Representatives of the State of Washington
Supreme Court of the State of Washington
State parks of Washington
State prisons of Washington
Structures in Washington
Supreme Court of the State of Washington
Symbols of the State of Washington
:Category:Symbols of Washington (state)

T
Tacoma, Washington
Telecommunications in Washington
Telephone area codes in Washington
Television shows set in Washington
Television stations in Washington
Territory of Oregon, (1848–1853)-1859
Territory of Washington, 1853–1889
Theatres in Washington
Tourism in Washington  website
Towns in Washington
Transportation in Washington
:Category:Transportation in Washington (state)

U
United States of America
States of the United States of America
United States census statistical areas of Washington
United States congressional delegations from Washington
United States congressional districts in Washington
United States Court of Appeals for the Ninth Circuit
United States District Court for the Eastern District of Washington
United States District Court for the Western District of Washington
United States representatives from Washington
United States senators from Washington
Universities and colleges in Washington
US-WA – ISO 3166-2:US region code for the State of Washington

V
Vancouver, Washington

W
WA – United States Postal Service postal code for the State of Washington
Washington  website
:Category:Washington (state)
Washington Public Ports Association
The Washington Restaurant Association
Washington Shoe Company
Washington State Capitol
Washington State Department of Information Services
Washington wine
Waterfalls of Washington
Wikimedia
Commons:Category:Washington (state)
Wikinews:Category:Washington
Wikinews:Portal:Washington
Wikipedia Category:Washington (state)
Wikipedia Portal:Washington (state)
Wikipedia:WikiProject Washington
:Category:WikiProject Washington
:Category:WikiProject Washington participants
Wind power in Washington

X
Xbox

Y
Yakima, Washington

Z
Zoos in Washington

See also

 
Topic overview:
Washington (state)
Outline of Washington (state)

Washington (State)
Washington (state)